The Fryksdal Line is an  long railway line between Kil, Värmland and Torsby in Sweden. The line is single track, and is not electric. Passenger services are provided by Värmlandstrafik using class Y31 DMUs. The line is also used by freight trains hauling mostly wood, pulpwood and paper.

References

Railway lines in Sweden